David Long may refer to:
 David Long (New Zealand musician), New Zealand musician and composer
 Dave Long (runner) (born 1960), former long-distance runner from Great Britain
 Dave Long (American football) (born 1944), American football defensive lineman
 David Long (defensive back) (born 1998), American football defensive back (2018 All Big Ten first team)
 David Long Jr., American football linebacker (2018 Big 12 defensive player of the year)
 David Long (mandolin player) (born 1975), mandolin player from Nashville, Tennessee
 David C. Long (born 1955), Indiana state senator
 David H. Long (born 1961), American businessman
 David Martin Long (1953–1999), American murderer
 David Ryan Long, author